"Move Me" is a standalone collaborative single by French synth-pop producer Lewis OfMan and Canadian pop singer Carly Rae Jepsen, released July 15, 2022, by Profil de Face. The release's cover art was illustrated by OfMan's father .

Background 
Per Jepsen, she was first introduced to OfMan's music via a playlist sent to her by a friend. She "kept pausing at the same track of Lewis's thinking 'this is really good'", and given the state of the world at the time she had a lot of "extra time to really listen to music and then ask questions like 'Who made this and how can we be friends?'" She called OfMan "the silver lining of my last two years when touring wasn't possible and travel was just a dream", and praised him as having "one of my favorite male voices." OfMan further explained that the two "met and worked in a really modern way, I received a call from her and I was honored that she liked my music in such a genuine way. Our relationship was Zoom-ed quite fast and we became close friends and these sessions almost felt like a shared diary, where we were sharing our stories." He also described his inspiration behind the song by saying "While I was living in Florence I had this special party where I found my heart shaken up by someone, I remember these insane blue eyes, but destiny wasn't OK for us to pursue each other, we were stuck in our own lives and couldn't mix them. The day after I wrote "Move Me" I was full of passion and dreams, and wanted to scream it out to the world", going on to note that he "had a session with Carly the same night, she instantly felt the song and sent me recordings of her beautiful voice and some additional ideas—it just made so much sense to do this duet together, it's such a beautiful encounter."

Style and reception 
Stereogums Chris DeVille called the song "a piano-powered house track, which seems quite timely in light of recent Drake and Beyoncé releases." BroadwayWorlds Michael Major wrote that the song "pair[s] classic house music piano chords with rich vocal melodies", making for "an infectious dose of slick dance-pop." Prelude Presss Dom Vigil called the track "a feel-good summer jam that you'll be listening to on repeat long after the warm weather goes away." Papers Shaad D'Souza wrote that "it's a joy to hear Carly Rae Jepsen go full-blown house diva" and "although the song hits all the euphoric highs of classic dance music, it's also pleasingly lo-fi, like a DIY version of a '90s classic."

Personnel 
 Lewis OfMan – vocals, producer, songwriter
 Carly Rae Jepsen – vocals, songwriter
 Bruno Ellingham – mixing engineer
 Alex Gopher – mastering engineer
  – cover art illustration

References 

2022 singles
2022 songs
Carly Rae Jepsen songs
Songs written by Carly Rae Jepsen
House music songs
Dance-pop songs